William J. Cooch (22 July 1898 – 17 September 1950) was a New Zealand artist, architect and stamp designer.

Cooch was born in Ireland and was one of four children of Lieutenant William Cooch of the 1st Royal Munster Fusiliers. Cooch trained as an architect in London and on 18 October 1922 married Mary Amelia Devanney. In the same year Cooch and his wife joined with his parents and siblings to emigrate to New Zealand. Cooch and his wife Mary had two daughters Pat and Angela.

Cooch settled in Wellington and gained employment as a government architect. One of the projects he worked on was Government House in Wellington. In his spare time, Cooch created prints working in woodcuts and linocuts. Both he and his sister, Louise Orgias (née Cooch) were members of the New Zealand Academy of Fine Arts. Cooch has examples of his works in the Auckland Art Gallery and also the Museum of New Zealand Te Papa Tongarewa.

Cooch was also a fine calligrapher and was involved in producing certificates for the refurbishment of the Waitangi Treaty House in the 1930s and also for the Disabled Servicemen's Training Centre in Riccarton, New Zealand in 1947.

Cooch also designed and etched designs for New Zealand postage stamps, notably the 1935 5d Swordfish in ultramarine as well as the Hygeia Goddess of Health, health stamp of 1932.

References

External links 
Hygeia Goddess of Health
Works by William Cooch in the collection of the Museum of New Zealand Te Papa Tongarewa
Works by William J. Cooch at the Alexander Turnbull Library
Works by William J. Cooch at the Auckland Art Gallery
King George VI Stamps - Frame design contributed to by William Cooch
Swordfish 5d - Design by William Cooch

1898 births
1950 deaths
20th-century New Zealand male artists
New Zealand architects
New Zealand stamp designers
New Zealand printmakers
New Zealand calligraphers